Sir Frank Leon Aroha Götz  (12 September 1892 – 14 September 1970) was a New Zealand politician of the National Party. Noted as a colourful character, he was commonly referred to by parliamentary colleagues as "the pirate" as he wore a black patch over a missing eye.

Biography

Early life and career
Götz was born in Auckland. He received his education in France (at the insistence of his Alsatian father) and at King's College, Wanganui Collegiate School, and Otago University. He was a rubber planter in Malaya from 1913. He served in World War I in the Malayan States Rifles and in the RAF, and lost his right arm and eye in an explosives accident. He returned to Malaya, but came to New Zealand again in 1925 when the rubber market collapsed.

Until 1935, he was general manager of New Zealand reparation estates in Western Samoa. He was then a broadcaster for 2ZB, a radio station in Wellington. This was followed by working for an Auckland-based insurance company, of which he eventually became manager. He had also worked in journalism and advertising as well, due to being a fluent linguist, a teacher of multiple languages.

Political career

In 1946, he unsuccessfully contested , being beaten by Labour's Bill Anderton. He then sought the National Party nomination for the Mount Albert by-election in 1947, but lost to Jack Garland.

He then represented the Otahuhu electorate from 1949 to 1954, and then the Manukau electorate from 1954 to 1963. In 1963 he was defeated when standing for Manurewa. He was appointed Minister of Internal Affairs, Ministers for Civil Defence and Minister of Island Territories on 12 December 1960, and held these posts until his defeat three years later. He had been a backbencher for 11 years and was 68 years old, but Prime Minister Keith Holyoake thought him capable to be a minister despite Deputy Prime Minister Jack Marshall not thinking him qualified.

He had ministerial responsibility for acclimatisation (as the New Zealand Wildlife Service was a division of the Department of Internal Affairs) and was caught returning from a duck shooting trip by a local ranger carrying more than the legal limit allowed, causing significant embarrassment for the government.

As Internal Affairs was responsible for the 1963 Royal Tour, Götz was knighted at the end of the tour in 1963 by being appointed a Knight Commander of the Royal Victorian Order for personal services to the sovereign, which caused some jealousy amongst his colleagues. In March 1964, Götz was granted the right to retain the title of The Honourable in recognition of his term as a member of the Executive Council of New Zealand.

Later life and death
From 1965 to 1968 he was the High Commissioner to Canada. While there he occupied much of his time hunting bears near the Arctic Circle. When his term expired he retired to Rotorua. Götz died on 14 September 1970 in Rotorua. He was survived by his wife.

Notes

References

Obituaries in Evening Post, 14 September 1970 & New Zealand Herald, 15 September 1970

|-

|-

New Zealand National Party MPs
Royal Air Force personnel of World War I
Plantation owners
1892 births
1970 deaths
High Commissioners of New Zealand to Canada
People educated at King's College, Auckland
People educated at Whanganui Collegiate School
University of Otago alumni
Members of the New Zealand House of Representatives
New Zealand MPs for Auckland electorates
Unsuccessful candidates in the 1963 New Zealand general election
Unsuccessful candidates in the 1946 New Zealand general election
New Zealand politicians with disabilities
New Zealand Knights Commander of the Royal Victorian Order
New Zealand politicians awarded knighthoods